Echium arenarium is a species of plants in the family Boraginaceae. It is native to the Mediterranean coast.

Sources

References 

arenarium
Flora of Malta